This is a list of the properties and historic districts in Stamford, Connecticut that are listed on the National Register of Historic Places. The locations of National Register properties and districts for which the latitude and longitude coordinates are included below, may be seen in an online map.

This list includes 35 properties that are entirely or partially in Stamford, one of which is also a National Historic Landmark.  Other Fairfield County properties are covered in National Register of Historic Places listings in Bridgeport, Connecticut, National Register of Historic Places listings in Greenwich, Connecticut and National Register of Historic Places listings in Fairfield County, Connecticut.

Twelve church complexes, with 26 buildings, were covered in a Multiple Property Submission study of churches in Stamford conducted in 1987.  One of these, St. Andrew's Protestant Episcopal Church, was already listed on the National Register. Some of the others were subsequently listed as result of the study.

Current listings

|}

See also

National Register of Historic Places listings in Fairfield County, Connecticut
National Register of Historic Places listings in Greenwich, Connecticut
National Register of Historic Places listings in Bridgeport, Connecticut
List of National Historic Landmarks in Connecticut

References

 
 Stamford
History of Stamford, Connecticut